Castillo de los Duques de Alba is a castle-palace in Alba de Tormes, Salamanca province, western Spain. It is the ancestral seat of the House of Alba. Today, the castle is in ruins and can be visited by the public.

History 
The castle dates back to the 12th century when king Ferdinand II of León built a watchtower on a site overlooking the river Tormes. King Sancho IV of Castile converted the tower into a castle, which destroyed in the times of king Henry IV of Castile. The House of Alba took possession of the site and García Álvarez de Toledo, 1st Duke of Alba rebuilt the castle as fortress and private residence. Fernando Álvarez de Toledo, 3rd Duke of Alba turned the castle in a true renaissance palace. Where the sober exterior contrasted with the rich interior containing beautiful frescos depicting the Battle of Mühlberg, where the duke distinguished himself. During the Napoleonic Wars the castle was destroyed, only one tower remained, which is still owned by the Alba family.

Archaeological excavations were made to uncover the former splendour of the castle-palace in 1991

Bibliography 
 Carlos Sarrthou Carreres (1991), Castillos de Espana. Espasa-Calpe, Madrid
 Manuel Retuerce (1992), “El castillo de Alba de Tormes: primeros resultados arqueológicos” in the Boletín de Amigos del Museo de Salamanca, 2, p. 19-22. (http://www.nrtarqueologos.com/wp-content/uploads/Retuerce-Castillo-Alba-Tormes.pdf)

References

External links 

 http://www.villaalbadetormes.com/ficha1.asp?id=28  Website of the municipality on the castle
 http://castillosdelolvido.com/castillo-de-alba-de-tormes/  Website describing the history and also containing a video with a reconstruction of the castle
 https://www.rutasconhistoria.es/loc/castillo-de-los-duques-de-alba Another local website on the history of the castle

Castles in Castile and León
Castles in Spain
House of Alba